Mikhail Starshinov (born December 12, 1971, Moscow) is a Russian political figure, deputy of the 5th, 6th, 7th, and 8th State Dumas. 

At the beginning of the 2000s, Starshinov engaged in entrepreneurial activities in Moscow and the Moscow Oblast; he owned and co-founded several large private enterprises. In 2005, he was appointed Vice-President of the Russian Coal CJSC. In 2006, Starshinov was the Deputy General Director of Elektrostal. In 2006, he started his political career in the Rodina party. The same year, he was elected a member of its central council, chairman of the council of the regional branch of the A Just Russia — For Truth party in the Smolensk Oblast. From 2007 to 2011, he was a member of the 5th State Duma. In 2011, he became a member of the All-Russia People's Front. In August 2011, he was excluded from the A Just Russia — For Truth party. In 2011-2016, Starshinov was the deputy of the 6th State Duma. In 2016 and 2021, he was re-elected for the 7th and 8th State Dumas, respectively.

On 24 March 2022, the United States Treasury sanctioned him in response to the 2022 Russian invasion of Ukraine.

References

1971 births
Living people
United Russia politicians
21st-century Russian politicians
Eighth convocation members of the State Duma (Russian Federation)
Russian individuals subject to the U.S. Department of the Treasury sanctions